is a Japanese competitive swimmer who specializes in individual medley.

She qualified for the 2016 Summer Olympics in Rio de Janeiro in the 200 meter individual medley. She swam the 5th best time in the heats and qualified for the semifinals where she was eliminated with the 9th best time.

She represented Japan at the 2020 Summer Olympics.

External links
 Profile The Sports

References

1994 births
Living people
People from Nagareyama
Japanese female medley swimmers
Olympic swimmers of Japan
Swimmers at the 2016 Summer Olympics
Asian Games medalists in swimming
Swimmers at the 2014 Asian Games
Swimmers at the 2018 Asian Games
Asian Games bronze medalists for Japan
Medalists at the 2014 Asian Games
Medalists at the 2018 Asian Games
Swimmers at the 2020 Summer Olympics
21st-century Japanese women